Ral GEF with PH domain and SH3 binding motif 1 is a protein in humans that is encoded by the RALGPS1 gene in chromosome 9.

References

Further reading 

Genes on human chromosome 9
Human proteins